Baaraige Fas is a 2009 Maldivian horror film directed by Amjad Ibrahim. Produced by Hassan Sobah under Eleven Eleven Productions, the film stars Mariyam Nisha, Hussain Sobah, Ali Shameel, Mariyam Shakeela, Amira Ismail and Ahmed Azmeel in pivotal roles.

Plotline
A female vampire, Afeefa (Mariyam Nisha) goes wandering around the island on her own while seducing a man into her trap and finally killing him. A journalist (Hussain Sobah) was assigned to prepare a news report on the incident. Afeefa, being an undergraduate, later joins a tuition center where she sucked the blood out of her classmate, Aminath Madheeha (Amira Ismail) when she see accidentally got a small cut on her neck. Afeefa's father, Nizar (Ali Shameel) buried Madheeha's body while her disappearance was reported on television and radio. Madheeha's friend, Naveen (Hussain Solah) suspects Afeefa's involvement in her disappearance since she was the last to be seen with her. In order to quench her thirst, Afeefa goes into a killing spree.

Cast 
 Hussain Sobah as Ziyad
 Mariyam Nisha as Afeefa
 Ali Shameel as Nizar
 Mariyam Shakeela as Samiya
 Hussain Solah as Naveen
 Amira Ismail as Aminath Madheeha
 Ahmed Azmeel as Adheel
 Ahmed Shah as Shafiu; Afeefa's victim
 Mariyam Shahuza as Aishath

Soundtrack

Accolades

References

2009 films
Maldivian horror films
Films directed by Amjad Ibrahim